Vitaly Rushnitsky (born 17 January 1990) is a Belarusian footballer who plays for Stenles Pinsk.

References

External links
 
 

1990 births
Living people
Sportspeople from Grodno Region
Belarusian footballers
Association football forwards
Belarusian expatriate footballers
Expatriate footballers in Russia
Expatriate footballers in Uzbekistan
FC Dinamo Minsk players
PFC Krylia Sovetov Samara players
FC Belshina Bobruisk players
FC Rechitsa-2014 players
FC Smorgon players
FC Shurtan Guzar players
FC Polotsk players
FC Volna Pinsk players
FC Slutsk players
FC UAS Zhitkovichi players
FC Lida players